Hiroshi Motomura (born 1953) is the Susan Westerberg Prager Professor of Law at the UCLA School of Law.  He is a leading scholar of American immigration and citizenship law.

Awards  
 2006 PSP Award for Excellence, Law & Legal Studies from the Association of American Publishers for Americans in Waiting
Guggenheim Fellowship (April 2017)

Works 
 Americans in Waiting: The Lost Story of Immigration and Citizenship in the United States. Oxford University Press, 2006.  
 Immigration and Citizenship: Process and Policy (8th ed.) West Academic Publishing, 2016. 
 Forced Migration: Law and Policy (2d ed.) West Academic Publishing, 2013. 
 Immigration Outside the Law Oxford University Press, 2014.

References 

1953 births
Living people